Valeriy Bondarenko (born 3 February 1994) is a Ukrainian professional footballer who plays as a defender for Oleksandriya on loan from Shakhtar Donetsk.

Career
Bondarenko is a product of the Obolon Kyiv and Arsenal Kyiv Youth Sportive School Systems. He spent time as player in the Ukrainian Premier League Reserves, but in August 2014 signed a contract with FC Torpedo Kutaisi in the Umaglesi Liga.

Honours

Club
Shakhtar Donetsk

Ukrainian Premier League 
Winner (1): 2018–19

Ukrainian Cup 
Winner (1): 2018–19

Career statistics

Club

References

External links
 
 

1994 births
Living people
Footballers from Kyiv
Ukrainian footballers
Association football defenders
FC Skala Stryi (2004) players
FC Torpedo Kutaisi players
FC Oleksandriya players
Ukrainian Premier League players
Ukrainian expatriate footballers
Expatriate footballers in Georgia (country)
Ukrainian expatriate sportspeople in Georgia (country)
FC Shakhtar Donetsk players
Expatriate footballers in Portugal
Ukrainian expatriate sportspeople in Portugal
Primeira Liga players
Vitória S.C. players
FC Vorskla Poltava players